The 1988–89 Courage Area League North was the second full season of rugby union within the fourth tier of the English league system, currently known as National League 2 North, and was the counterpart to Courage Area League South (currently National League 2 South). By the end of the season Roundhay were crowned league champions, just 1 point ahead of runners up Broughton Park, gaining promotion to the 1989–90 National Division Three.  

At the other end of the table Birmingham were easily the weakest team, failing to register a single point as they suffered a second successive relegation, dropping to Midlands 1.  It would be Birmingham's final season as a single entity as they would merge with Solihull (themselves relegated the previous campaign) to form Birmingham & Solihull RFC for the 1989–90 season.

Structure

Each team played one match against each of the other teams, playing a total of ten matches each.  The champions are promoted to National Division 3 and the bottom team was relegated to either North 1 or Midlands 1 depending on their locality.

Participating teams and locations

League table

Sponsorship
Area League North is part of the Courage Clubs Championship and was sponsored by Courage Brewery.

See also
 National League 2 North

References

N4
National League 2 North